Abakuá, also sometimes known as Ñañiguismo, is an Afro-Cuban men's initiatory fraternity or secret society, which originated from fraternal associations in the Cross River region of southeastern Nigeria and southwestern Cameroon.

Abakuá has been described as "an Afro-Cuban version of Freemasonry".

The Cuban artist Belkis Ayón intensively investigated the Abakuá mythology in her prints.

History

Origins in Cuba

Known generally as Ekpe, Egbo, Ngbe, or Ugbe among the multi-lingual groups in the region, it was believed that Ñáñigos, as the members are known, could be transformed into leopards to stalk their enemies. In contemporary Haiti, where secret societies have remained strong, an elite branch of the army that was set up to instill fear in the restless masses was named The Leopards. Among the less mystical Ñáñigo revenges was the ability to turn people over to slavers. In Africa they were notorious operators who had made regular deals for profit with slavers.

The creolized Cuban term Abakuá is thought to refer to the Abakpa area in southeast Nigeria, where the society was active. The first such societies were established by Africans in the town of Regla, Havana, in 1836. This remains the main area of Abakuá implantation, especially the district of Guanabacoa in eastern Havana, and in Matanzas where Afro-Cuban culture is vibrant.

Spread to Florida
Cities with many Afro-Cuban immigrants in Florida such as Key West and Ybor City had a religion known by observers as "Nañigo" which was referred to as "Carabali Apapa Abacua" by practitioners. By the 1930s much of the religion seemed to have disappeared from visibility.

For Abakuá lodges to be formed a structured initiation rite must be performed, something difficult to do for immigrant Abakuá members who are estranged from established lodges in Cuba. For this reason there is a debate as to whether the practices described as "Nañigo" were official Abakuá practices or simply imitations done by members estranged from official lodges. The term "Nañigo" itself was often used to describe any Afro-Cuban traditions practiced in Florida, and is thus not reliable to use to describe any set of traditions with accuracy.

No Abakuá lodges had been formed in Miami until 1998 an Abakuá group declared its existence in Miami only for Cuban Abakuá members to denounce it since their lodge wasn't officially consecrated with sacred materials only found in Cuba.

Culture and practices

Membership
Members of this society came to be known as ñañigos, a word used to designate the street dancers of the society. The ñañigos, who were also called diablitos, were well known by the general population in Cuba through their participation in the Carnival on the Day of the Three Kings, when they danced through the streets wearing their ceremonial outfit, a multicolored checkerboard dress with a conical headpiece topped with tassels.

The oaths of loyalty to the Abakuá society’s sacred objects, members, and secret knowledge taken by initiates are a lifelong pact which creates a sacred kinship among the members. The duties of an Abakuá member to his ritual brothers at times surpass even the responsibilities of friendship, and the phrase "Friendship is one thing, and the Abakuá another" is often heard. One of the oaths made during initiation is that one will not reveal the secrets of the Abakuá to non-members, which is why the Abakuá have remained hermetic for over 160 years.

Ceremony
Besides acting as a mutual aid society, the Abakuá performs rituals and ceremonies, called plantes, full of theatricality and drama which consists of drumming, dancing, and chanting in the secret Abakuá language. Knowledge of the chants is restricted to Abakuá members, but Cuban scholars have long thought that the ceremonies express Abakuá cultural history. Other ceremonies such as initiations and funerals, are secret and occur in the sacred room of the Abakuá temple, called the famba.

Music
The rhythmic dance music of the Abakuá combined with Bantu traditions of the Congo contributed to the musical tradition of the rumba.

Although hermetic and little known even within Cuba, an analysis of Cuban popular music recorded from the 1920s until the present reveals Abakuá influence in nearly every genre of Cuban popular music. Cuban musicians who are members of the Abakuá have continually documented key aspects of their society’s history in commercial recordings, usually in their secret Abakuá language. The Abakuá have commercially recorded actual chants of the society, believing that outsiders cannot interpret them. Because Abakuá represented a rebellious, even anti-colonial, aspect of Cuban culture, these secret recordings have been very popular.

Dancers

Ireme is the Cuban term for the masked Abakuá dancer known as Idem or Ndem in the Cross River region. The masquerade dancer is carefully covered in a tight-fitting suit and hood, and dances with a broom and a staff. The broom serves to cleanse faithful members, while the staff chastises enemies and Abakuá traitors. During initiation ceremonies, the staff is called the Erí nBan nDó, while during mournings and wakes it is called AlanManguín Besuá.

Religion
Abakuá members derive their belief systems and traditional practices from the Efik, Efut, Ibibio, Igbo, Ijaw and Bahumono spirits that lived in the forest. Ekpe and synonymous terms were names of both a forest spirit and a leopard related secret society. Much of what the Abakua believe in terms of religion is considered a secret only known to members.

Language
Due to the secrecy of the society, little is known of the Abakuá language.  It is assumed to be a creolized version of Efik or Ibibio, both closely related languages or dialects from the Cross River region of Nigeria, because this is the cultural region and ethnic groups where the society originated.

If it is indeed a creolized version of either Efik or Ibibio, it could be compared in purpose and in its formation and origins to other African languages, or specialized vocabularies derived from African languages, used in other Afro-American religions, such as:
Lucumí: a Yoruba derived lexicon used as a ritual language in the Cuban Santería religion
Iorubá/Nagô: another Yoruba derived sacred language used in the liturgy of Brazilian Candomblé Ketu tradition
Habla Congo: code-switching between Kikongo vocabulary and Spanish words, used in the Palo religion of Cuba and other Caribbean countries, 
"Kromanti"/Jamaican Maroon spirit-possession language: creolized form of the Asante dialect of the Akan language from the Ashanti Region of Ghana, used in Jamaican Maroon religious ceremonies involving possession by ancestors, which grant the possessee the ability to speak the language
Haitian Vodou Culture Language: specialized vocabulary derived from African languages used in Haitian Vodou
Pala Wida: liturgical language used in Venezuelan Yuyu, derived from mostly Ewe, Kongo and Creolized Spanish

Disambiguation
Abacuá also describes a group of Afro-Cuban people of the carabalí as well as their style of music and their percussion instruments.

The Abakuá Afro-Latin Dance Company, a dance company based in New York City, draws its namesake from this origin. The purpose for selecting this name was to recognize the company's link to the origins of the type of music the company performs to. The company does not claim to be an authentic representation of the specific style native to Abakuá but rather, an amalgamation of movements native to Afro-Cuban/Caribbean culture and the development of the company's own unique style entitled Afro-Latin Funk. The selection of the name "Afro-Latin" was done in order to identify the company's presence within Latin and Hispanic culture as a whole.

See also
 Egbo
Kromanti dance (religious)
Antonio Maceo Grajales
Santería
Secret society

Notes

Further reading
  
Article on Cuban Abakuá music written by Dr Ivor Miller at lameca.org

Afro-American religion
Afro-Cuban culture
Cuban-American culture
Society of Cuba
African secret societies
Organizations established in 1836
1836 establishments in the Spanish Empire